The Citroën C1 ev'ie is an electric car conversion from a standard Citroën C1 by the now defunct Electric Car Corporation. The model was first released on 30 April 2009, with a 2010 list price of £19,860 ($30,890 US) this makes the C1 ev'ie a competitively priced electric car.

The Citroën C1 ev'ie's body and fittings are essentially identical to a standard C1. Differences for the electric model include a fixed-ratio transmission and regenerative braking (with ABS). A standard 5-speed gearbox is used but fixed into 3rd gear. The regenerative braking is automatically partially applied as soon as the accelerator is released, not just when the brake pedal is pressed, making it act like engine braking, instead of acting like putting a car into neutral and coasting. ECC buys C1s and then removes the engine and gas tank, adds batteries, electric motor, heater, and an engine-management system.

By placing the batteries in place of the standard fossil fuel tank, as well as in the engine compartment, no boot space is lost compared to the standard C1 model.

The car is charged from a standard household electrical outlet, in 6 hours.

With the demise of ECC, support for these vehicles is available from ev-support.co.uk, who took on the final warranty work for ECC and subsequently purchased all the remaining stock of spare parts. Certain parts being no longer available are now remanufactured by EV-Support.

See also
Government incentives for plug-in electric vehicles
List of modern production plug-in electric vehicles
Plug-in electric vehicle

References

External links
 Electric Car Corporation website
 Youtube video of EV'ie
 Review of the EV'ie
 UK based EV support website

Electric vehicle conversion
Electric cars
Citroën vehicles